Cerne Abbey was a Benedictine monastery founded in 987 in the town now called Cerne Abbas, Dorset, by Æthelmær the Stout.

History
The abbey was founded in 987 by Æthelmær the Stout. Ælfric of Eynsham, the most prolific writer in Old English, spent time at the abbey as a priest and teacher.

King Cnut plundered this monastery during an attack upon the town, but afterwards became a benefactor of it.

By the time of the Domesday Book, the abbey had added substantially to its endowment. Much of this wealth has been credited to the veneration of Saint Eadwold of Cerne, a 9th-century hermit reputedly a brother of Edmund, king of East Anglia. Eadwold lived as a hermit on a hill about four miles from Cerne.

The later history appears to have been relatively uneventful; A History of the County of Dorset says that its history is "perhaps the least eventful of any of the Dorset houses with the exception of that of the sisters at Tarrant Kaines". The abbey's history ended on a less positive note, with the last abbot, Thomas Corton, accused of various offences including that of allowing the abbey and lands to become ruinous, and of keeping a mistress who seems to have borne him children. The accusations were taken seriously enough to warrant inspection by commissioners, and the abbey was closed in 1539.

Following Dissolution of the Monasteries, the buildings were mainly demolished. Abbey House, a Grade I listed building, occupies the site of the gatehouse and incorporates parts of it. Most of the house dates from after a fire in the middle of the 18th century in which the gatehouse was seriously damaged. The late 15th-century Guest House of the abbey is also Grade I listed, as is the very elaborate stone vaulted porch of the abbot's hall, built around 1500, which survives in the midst of a wooded lawn, with a Grade II* listed, early 16th century barn lying to its north. A Grade I listed, 14th-century tithe barn, converted to a house in the late 18th century, lies to its east.

Abbots of Cerne
Ælfric, appointed about 987, on the refoundation of Cerne as a Benedictine monastery 
Alfric Puttoc, occurs 1023 
Withelmus, occurs 1085 
Haimo, deposed 1102 for simony
William, occurs 1121
Bernard, became abbot of Burton in 1160
Robert, occurs 1166
Dionysius, occurs 1206, resigned 1220
R., elected 1220 
William de Hungerford, elected 1232 
Richard de Suwell or Sawel, elected 1244, died 1260
Philip, elected 1260 
Thomas de Ebblesbury, elected 1274
Gilbert de Minterne, elected 1296, died 1312
Ralph de Cerne, elected 1312, died 1324
Richard de Osmington, elected 1324
Stephen Sherrard, elected 1356 
Thomas Sewale, elected 1361, died 1382
John de Hayle, elected 1382, died in same year
Robert Symondsbury, elected 1382 
John Wede, elected 1411, died 1427
John Winterborne, elected 1427, died 1436
John Godmanston, elected 1436, died 1451
William Cattistoke, elected 1451, died 1454
John Helyer, elected 1454, resigned 1458
John Vanne, elected 1458, died 1471
Roger Bemyster, elected 1471, died 1497
Thomas Sam, elected 1497, died 1509
Robert Westbury, elected 1510,  died 1524
Thomas Corton, elected 1524, surrendered his abbey 1539

References

 Anthony New. 'A Guide to the Abbeys of England And Wales', p107-09. Constable.
 Houses of Benedictine monks: The abbey of Cerne, A History of the County of Dorset: Volume 2 (1908), pp. 53–8.

987 establishments
Anglo-Saxon monastic houses
Christian monasteries established in the 10th century
Benedictine monasteries in England
Monasteries in Dorset
Grade I listed buildings in Dorset
1539 disestablishments in England
10th-century establishments in England